Reverend Michael Bray is an American Lutheran minister who was convicted in 1985, along with two other defendants of two counts of conspiracy and one count of possessing unregistered explosive devices in relation to seven bombings of women's health clinics and three offices of women's health advocacy groups in Washington, D.C., Delaware, Maryland and Virginia. Bray and his wife, Jayne, are the named defendants in the Supreme Court decision Bray v. Alexandria, a ruling that determined pro-life demonstrators could not block entrances to abortion clinics in order to stop patients from entering to receive services.  

At the time of his conviction he was a member of the Christian extremist terrorist organization Army of God. Because of his involvement with the organization, public acts of terrorism, and suspected authorship of the underground manual Army of God, Bray is considered "the intellectual father of the extreme radical fringe of the antiabortion movement which engages in terrorism." Initially sentenced to ten years in prison, he agreed to a Alford plea and served only 46 months between 1985 to 1989.

Background 
Bray attended the United States Naval Academy for one year as a Midshipman. He was also a volunteer firefighter with the Bowie Maryland Fire Department. He was based in Bowie, Maryland, and later moved to Wilmington, Ohio, where he professes to be a member of the Army of God, considered a terrorist organization by the F.B.I. among others. Some of the writings that Bray completed during his involvement with the Army of God included the following:

 Army of God, an organizational manual that details how to do destruction and sabotage for abortion clinics. Bray is strongly suspected to be the author of this manual though he has never confirmed nor denied this claim.  
 Capitol Area Christian News. (1991-2002). a militant newsletter that focused on homosexuality, abortion and what Bray considered to be government abuses of power

Participation in terrorism 
While most nations have their own specific legal definition of terrorism, many terrorist researchers and experts have expressed the need for a universal definition that is narrow and can be applied globally. A proposed definition that fits this bill defines terrorism as a "focused attack on unarmed, non-combatant civilians, that has a political aim" Following these guidelines for determining whether an egregious act of violence can be considered a terrorist attack or not, makes it apparent that acts Rev. Michael Bray engaged in can, in fact, be classified as terrorism. The attacks that were led by Bray himself as well as other Army of God members specifically targeted women's healthcare providers. The providers were civilian physicians, nurses, and other employees who were unarmed. The aim of Bray's attacks, as well as the aim others carried out by the Army of God movement, was political in the fact that the goal was to create enough hysteria and chaos that Roe v. Wade would be eventually overturned. 

In 1994, the Federal Bureau of Investigation (F.B.I.) suspected that he and other anti-abortion figures might be developing "a conspiracy that endeavors to achieve political or social change through activities that involve force or violence", as stated in a confidential Teletype message sent to all 56 F.B.I. field offices. This further justifies classifying these acts as terrorism. 

In addition to the bombings that Bray participated in himself, he authored several publications that advocated for the killing doctors and health workers who perform abortions which inspired the actions of other Army of God members, and provided detailed instructions on how to do so as he is presumed to be the author of the Army of God manual. Bray became the spokesperson for Rev. Paul Hill after he murdered Dr. John Britton and James Barrett in 1994 at a women's health clinic in Pensacola, Florida. Bray also publicly defended the actions of Shelly Shannon who shot Dr. George Tiller as he left his clinic in Wichita, Kansas, and later applauded Scott Roeder for eventually murdering him while he was attending a church service in 2009.

Religious extremism: Army of God ideology 
The actions of Bray and other Army of God members were considered extreme and denounced by other pro-life groups at the time. Bray's Lutheran background informed the ideology he eventually developed in the time he spent in the Army of God movement, although this involved taking many Biblical scriptures and teaching out of context while actively challenging traditional interpretations made by mainstream theologians. Perhaps one of the most notable interpretations was the way Bray justified violent actions, and taking human life. From Bray's perspective, Christianity granted him the right to defend unborn children even if it meant doing violence, destroying property, and even killing doctors and staff who were "murdering them". The Army of God used a single Bible passage, Psalms 91: "You will not be afraid of the terror by night, or of the arrow that flies by day", to justify this line their logic and interpreted this line as divine approval for their actions. They further justified their terrorist actions by claiming that they were defensive in nature, as they were defending the lives of innocent unborn children. That is, the targeted attacks on health care workers and women's health clinics were not done out of revenge against doctors for performing abortions, but to defend future lives who would be lost. 

An age-old ethical dilemma in Christian scholarship is determining if or when one is justified in their use of violence as a means of pursuing a righteous cause. In other words, is there such thing as a "just war"? The Army of God saw themselves as being "at war" with the mainstream U.S. culture following the Supreme Court decision on Roe v. Wade when abortion became legalized. From their perspective, society was then divided into two parts, the secular state which condoned the practice of abortion, and those who shared their Christian identity and viewed this practice as morally reprehensible. Bray found perceived support for his justification of violence and murder in the previous writings of 20th-century Lutheran pastors Dietrich Bonhoeffer, who he admired as a Christian martyr in his attempted assassination of Adolf Hitler, and theologian Reinhold Niebuhr. However, a primary difference between their ideology and Bray's is that both of them supported a separation between church and state, while Bray and the Army of God advocated for a type of politics that was biblically based and rooted in Christianity.

References

External links
Official website
Army of God website
Daily KOS.com site
Comment on the 60 Minutes interview

Year of birth missing (living people)
Living people
Bombers (people)
People from Wilmington, Ohio
People who entered an Alford plea
Perpetrators of religiously motivated violence in the United States
United States Navy midshipmen
Attacks on Planned Parenthood facilities
Army of God (United States)
People from Bowie, Maryland